The Russian monitor Admiral Chichagov was the second and last of the two s built for the Imperial Russian Navy in the late 1860s. The ship was assigned to the Baltic Fleet upon completion and remained there for her entire career. Aside from an incident where she ran aground, her service was uneventful. The sister ships were reclassified as coast-defense ironclads in 1892 before they became training ships in 1900. Admiral Spiridov was stricken from the Navy List in 1907 and became a target ship. Her ultimate fate is unknown.

Design and description
The ships were designed to displace , but turned out to be overweight and actually displaced . Their crew consisted of 280 officers and crewmen. The Admiral Spiridov class had a single two-cylinder horizontal direct-acting steam engine. It drove a single propeller using steam provided by four rectangular fire-tube boilers. She was fitted with three masts in a light fore-and-aft rig to steady her and aid in maneuvering.

The monitors were ultimately designed to be armed with four Obukhov 9-inch rifled guns, a pair in each turret. In 1874–75 the guns were replaced by a single  gun. During the Russo-Turkish War of 1877–78, a 9-inch mortar was fitted to attack the thin deck armor of enemy ships, but accuracy was poor and they were later removed, probably in the early 1880s.  An improved, more powerful, 11-inch gun was installed aboard Admiral Chichagov during the 1880s. Light guns for use against torpedo boats were added to the Admiral Spiridov-class ships during the Russo-Turkish War when a pair of 4-pounder  guns were mounted on the roofs of each gun turret. A variety of other small guns are known to have been fitted, but details are lacking. The ships could also carry 12 to 15 mines.

The turrets had 6 inches of armor, except around the gun ports, where it thickened to 6.5 inches.

Construction and service
Admiral Chichagov, named for Admiral Vasily Chichagov, was ordered on 4 June 1865 from the Semiannikov & Poletika Shipyard, Saint Petersburg, although the formal keel-laying was not until 20 November 1866. Construction was delayed by changes to the design and late deliveries of components. She was launched on 28 August 1868 and then transferred to Kronstadt for fitting out as the shallow waters around Saint Petersburg prevented deep-draft ships from being completed. This added more delays as the dockyard there lacked the equipment to efficiently fit out the ships, and she officially entered service in 1869 at the cost of 1,177,500 rubles.

On 20 July 1870, Admiral Chichagov struck a sandbank near Koivisto at full speed. While not damaged in the incident, she was very firmly stuck and, an attempt by the armored frigate  pull her off failed two days later when the hawser snapped. While rigging another hawser aboard Strelets, it moved unexpectedly, badly injuring the ship's executive officer and a bosun, who later died of his injuries. The subsequent attempt by Sevastopol also failed, so several barges and a floating crane were summoned from Kronstadt the next day. As much weight as possible was transferred to the barges, including her forward guns, and she was successfully pulled free on 25 July. Admiral Chichagov was not damaged in the incident.

On 18 July 1875, she accidentally collided with the monitor , but neither ship was seriously damaged. Admiral Chichagov served as the flagship for Captain 1st Rank Stepan Makarov during the 1885 fleet maneuvers in the approaches to the Gulf of Riga. She was reclassified as a coast-defense ironclad on 13 February 1892. By this time, her role in Russian war plans was to defend the Gulf of Riga against an anticipated German amphibious landing. In 1900, Admiral Chichagov was assigned to the Kronstadt Engineering School as a training ship, although she was transferred to Libau during the Russo-Japanese War of 1904–05 to reinforce the port's defenses. The ship was transferred to the Port of Kronstadt on 31 March 1907 for disposal. The ship was stricken on 14 August and her hulk was used as a target near Reval. Her ultimate fate is unknown.

Notes

Footnotes

References

Further reading

Admiral Spiridov-class monitors
1868 ships
Ships built at Sredne-Nevskiy Shipyard